The 34th Rifle Corps was a corps of the Soviet Red Army. It was part of the 19th Army. It took part in the Great Patriotic War.

Organization 
 129th Rifle Division
 158th Rifle Division
 171st Rifle Division

Commanders 
 Divisional commander Vasily Matveyevich Gonin (until February 1940) 
 Divisional commander Konstantin Piadyshev (February 1940 to May 1940)
 Division commander Prokofy Romanenko (May 1940 to June 1940)
 Major General Raphael Khmelnitsky (June 21, 1940 to August 9, 1941)
 Colonel Adrian Zakharovich Akimenko (July 24 to August 10, 1941)

Rifle corps of the Soviet Union